Samuel Lester Snead (born January 19, 1971) is an American football executive who is the general manager of the Los Angeles Rams of the National Football League (NFL), a position he has held since 2012. Prior to joining the Rams in 2012, Snead served in the Jacksonville Jaguars and Atlanta Falcons front offices from 1995-2011.

Early years
Snead was born and grew up in Eufaula, Alabama and was an all-state offensive guard at Eufaula High School. He switched to tight end at Troy State before attending the University of Alabama at Birmingham and earning a varsity letter for playing on the first NCAA-sanctioned Division III UAB Blazers football team. He then transferred to Auburn. After Snead served as a graduate assistant at Auburn, he became a scout.

Professional career
In 1995, Snead was hired by the expansion Jacksonville Jaguars as a pro scout, where he worked until 1997, when he was hired by the Atlanta Falcons to the same position. In 2009, he was promoted to director of pro/player personnel, where he remained for the following two seasons.

St Louis Rams
On February 10, 2012, the Rams announced that they had hired Snead to become the team's new general manager.
On March 12, 2012, Snead made his first big deal as general manager, as the Rams agreed to a trade with the Washington Redskins that would exchange their No. 2 overall selection in the 2012 NFL Draft for the Redskins' sixth and 39th overall selections. The Rams also received Washington's first round selections for the 2013 and 2014 drafts. In the draft the Rams traded the sixth pick for the Dallas Cowboys' 14th pick, and selected defensive tackle Michael Brockers. Snead used the Rams' second round pick (39th overall) to select cornerback Janoris Jenkins. In the sixth round, Snead and the Rams used the 171st overall pick to select future All-Pro kicker Greg Zuerlein. Snead also signed rookie free agent Johnny Hekker, destined to become a perennial All-Pro punter.

In the 2014 NFL Draft, Snead had two first round picks, in which he selected Auburn offensive tackle Greg Robinson with the No. 2 overall pick and then Pittsburgh defensive tackle Aaron Donald at No. 13. While Robinson was traded away after three disappointing seasons, Donald quickly emerged as one of the NFL's most dominant defensive players, earning NFL Defensive Rookie of the Year in 2014 and being named NFL Defensive Player of the Year in both 2017 and 2018. Later in the draft, Snead and the Rams drafted defensive end Michael Sam of Missouri, the first openly gay player to enter the NFL draft, with their first sixth-round draft pick (No. 249 overall). Ultimately, Sam did not make the team's regular season roster. Despite lingering concerns over a surgically repaired knee after a torn ACL, Snead gambled and selected Georgia running back Todd Gurley with the 10th overall pick in the 2015 NFL Draft. The gamble paid off, as Gurley earned NFL Offensive Rookie of the Year honors by rushing for 1,106 yards and 10 touchdowns despite missing three full games and most of another. Offensive tackle Rob Havenstein was also selected in the second round (No. 57 overall) and has been a Rams starter since his rookie season.

Los Angeles Rams

Following the approval of the Rams' relocation to Los Angeles, Snead and his family settled in Malibu. Just prior to the 2016 NFL Draft, the Rams announced a blockbuster trade with the Tennessee Titans, in which Los Angeles acquired the No. 1 overall pick from Tennessee along with fourth and sixth round selections in exchange for the Rams No. 15 overall pick, two second-round picks, and a third-round pick. The Titans also received the Rams' first- and third-round picks in 2017. With the first pick in the draft, Snead and Rams head coach Jeff Fisher selected Cal quarterback Jared Goff, later to become a Pro Bowler for the Rams. Fourth round pick Tyler Higbee, a tight end from Western Kentucky, was also selected in the draft and has become a regular starter. However, as the Rams' return to Los Angeles unraveled into a 4-12 mess, the relationship between Snead and Fisher began to deteriorate publicly. Fisher, who was fired with three games to go in the season, chided Snead for losing defensive backfield starters Janoris Jenkins and Rodney McLeod in free agency. Following the end of the 2016 season, it was uncertain if the Rams would retain Snead, who, like Fisher, had signed a two-year extension in early December.

Snead was among the team executives who interviewed Sean McVay for the vacant head coaching position, and was the first to speak following McVay's impressive interview, declaring "I'm buying stock in Sean McVay." In 2017, Snead signed key veteran free agents including wide receiver Robert Woods and offensive tackle Andrew Whitworth, and had a very productive 2017 NFL Draft selecting tight end Gerald Everett, wide receiver Cooper Kupp, safety John Johnson, wide receiver Josh Reynolds, and linebacker Samson Ebukam. Rebuilding the roster was instrumental in the Rams' 11-5 season, which included their first NFC West title since 2003 and a trip to the playoffs. The success continued in 2018, as the Rams improved to 13-3, with their second straight NFC West title, an NFC Championship and a berth in Super Bowl LIII. Key personnel acquisitions by Snead before and during that season included trades for wide receiver Brandin Cooks, cornerbacks Marcus Peters and Aqib Talib, and linebacker Dante Fowler, as well as signing veteran stars Todd Gurley and Aaron Donald to long term contracts. In 2019, Snead made a blockbuster trade, sending a 2020 first-round pick, a 2021 first-round pick, and a 2021 fourth-round pick to the Jacksonville Jaguars for star cornerback Jalen Ramsey

Finding a close alignment in their respective football philosophies, Snead and McVay have since had a harmonious relationship. In May 2019, they attended the Kentucky Derby together. In July 2019, the Los Angeles Rams signed Snead to a contract extension that will keep him with the franchise through the 2023 season.

Snead tested positive for COVID-19 during the 2021 NFL Draft and was forced to self-isolate for the remainder of the draft.

After the Rams were eliminated in the 2020-21 NFL playoffs, Snead faced some criticism for the massive contract he signed Goff to after their Super Bowl berth. Facing pressure to win now, Snead swung a blockbuster trade, sending Goff, a 2021 third-round pick, a 2022 first-round pick, and a 2023 first-round pick to the Detroit Lions for quarterback Matthew Stafford. During the offseason, Snead signed wide receiver DeSean Jackson and traded a 2022 fifth-round pick and a 2022 sixth-round pick to the New England Patriots for running back Sony Michel. As the season progressed, Snead became well-known league-wide for his tendency to make big moves. In November, Snead made another blockbuster trade, sending a 2022 second-round pick and a 2022 third-round pick to the Denver Broncos for star pass rusher Von Miller. And when Jackson was released shortly after, Snead quickly signed star wide receiver Odell Beckham Jr. These moves resulted in the Rams winning Super Bowl LVI, earning Snead his first championship as an executive.

Personal life
Snead married sports media personality Kara Henderson in the fall of 2012 and the couple currently resides in Malibu, California.  Snead has two children, Cannon and Logan, from a previous marriage.

References

External links
 Los Angeles Rams bio
 Football Record Book
  Pro Football Reference

1971 births
Living people
Auburn University alumni
University of Alabama alumni
Los Angeles Rams executives
Atlanta Falcons executives
Atlanta Falcons scouts
National Football League general managers
Players of American football from Alabama
People from Eufaula, Alabama
UAB Blazers football
Auburn Tigers football players
Troy Trojans football players